Peter McCann is the debut album by Peter McCann and was released in 1977.  It reached No. 82 on the Billboard Top LPs chart.

The album featured two singles: "Do You Wanna Make Love", which reached No. 5 on the Billboard Hot 100 and "Save Me Your Love", which did not chart.

Track listing
All songs written by Peter McCann.
 "Do You Wanna Make Love" – 3:33
 "Everybody's Got to Hold on to Something" - 2:51
 "I Can't Live Without You" - 3:34
 "It's Easy" - 2:55
 "The Things You Left Behind" - 3:30
 "Save Me Your Love" - 2:31
 "Suicide and Vine" - 2:39
 "Broken White Line" – 3:21
 "Right Time of the Night" – 3:09
 "If You Can't Find Love" – 3:29

Personnel
Hal Yoergler – producer
Barry Rudolph – engineer
Larry Hirsch – engineer
Bob MacLeod – mastering
Artie Butler – arranger (tracks: 1, 3, 6–7)
Brian Whitcomb – arranger (tracks: 4, 8), keyboards
Peter McCann – arranger (tracks: 5, 10), lead vocals, piano, acoustic guitar
George Marinelli, Jr. – electric guitar
John Hug – electric guitar, acoustic guitar
Dennis Belfield – bass
Ernie Watts – saxophone, oboe
Michael Botts – drums (tracks: 1–9)
Ace Holleran – drums (track: 10)
Larry Treadwell – harmonica

Charts

Singles

References

External links
Peter McCann, Peter McCann credits Retrieved June 29, 2016.

1977 debut albums
20th Century Fox Records albums
Peter McCann albums